Turn-by-turn Navigation is a feature of some satellite navigation devices where directions for a selected route are continually presented to the user in the form of spoken or visual instructions. The system keeps the user up-to-date about the best route to the destination, and is often updated according to changing factors such as traffic and road conditions. Turn-by-turn systems typically use an electronic voice to inform the user whether to turn left or right, the street name, and the distance to the next turn.

Mathematically, turn by turn navigation is based on the shortest path problem within graph theory, which examines how to identify the path that best meets some criteria (shortest, cheapest, fastest, etc.) between two points in a large network.

History
Real-time turn-by-turn navigation instructions by computer was first developed at the MIT Media Laboratory by James Raymond Davis and Christopher M. Schmandt in 1988. Their system, Backseat Driver, monitored the car's position using a system developed by NEC that communicated over a cellular modem with software running on a Symbolics LISP Machine at the Media Lab. The computer then used a speech synthesizer to compute appropriate directions and spoke them to the driver using a second cellular phone.

Devices and services
Major mapping services that offer turn-by-turn navigation, grouped by map data provider:
HERE Technologies: 
HERE WeGo, a free online and offline navigation app for Android, Fire OS and iOS
Garmin, road portable navigation devices, car built-in navigation devices
Genius Maps, a paid online and offline turn-by-turn navigation app for Android, HarmonyOS and iOS
Google:
Google Maps, a free online navigation app for Android, iOS and KaiOS
TomTom: 
TomTom car, motorcycle and truck portable navigation devices, car and truck built-in navigation devices, Android and iOS smartphones and tablets online and offline through AmiGO
Apple Maps, a free online navigation app for iPhone and ipad using iOS 6 or later
Petal Maps, a free online and offline navigation app for Android 7 or later, HarmonyOS and iOS
Windows Maps, a free online and offline navigation app for Windows
 OpenStreetMap. Offline-capable applications that use volunteer-contributed data:
Karta GPS, a free online and offline navigation app for Android and iOS
Locus Map, a free online and offline navigation app for Android
 Magic Earth, a free online and offline navigation app for Android, Fire OS and iOS
MAPS.ME, a free offline and open-source app for Android and iOS
Mapy.cz, a free online and offline navigation app for Android, iOS and Windows
OsmAnd, a free online and offline navigation app for Android, Fire OS and iOS
Scout GPS Link for Android and iOS
Other:
smartphones and tablets with iOS 5 or earlier using various commercial software
Sygic GPS Navigation, a paid offline turn-by-turn navigation app for Android and iOS (map data based on Here, TomTom, OpenStreetMap and Sygic Maps)
Waze, a free app providing turn-by-turn navigation on Android, iOS and Windows

References